Australia has competed in athletics in all Summer Olympics. Edwin Flack won the Men's 800 m and 1500 m at the 1896 Summer Olympics. He won Australia's first athletics and Olympics medals and was that country’s first gold medallist. Athletics is the Australia's second most successful Olympic sport after swimming.

Statistics 1896-2021

 Australia has won 76 medals: 21 gold, 27 silver, and 28 bronze medals.
 Australian women have won 40 medals: 13 gold, 13 silver, and 14 bronze medals
 Australia men have won 36 medals: 8 gold, 14 silver, and 14 bronze medals
 Number of female athletes winning medals: 30 
 Number of male athletes winning medals: 37 
 Sixteen athletes have won individual gold medals: Edwin Flack (dual), Nick Winter, John Winter, Marjorie Jackson (dual), Shirley Strickland de la Hunty (triple), Betty Cuthbert (four), Herb Elliott, Ralph Doubell, Maureen Caird,  Glynis Nunn, Debbie Flintoff-King, Cathy Freeman, Steve Hooker, Sally Pearson and Jared Tallent
 Two athletes have won relay gold medals: Norma Croker and Fleur Mellor
Most medals: Shirley Strickland de la Hunty (7), 1948, 1952, 1956, including 3 gold, 1 silver, 3 bronze; Betty Cuthbert (4), 1956 & 1964, including 4 gold; Jared Tallent (4), 2008, 2012, 2016, including 1 gold, 2 silver, 1 bronze;Raelene Boyle (3), 1968 & 1972, including 3 silver; Stan Rowley (3) 1900, including 3 bronze
Multiple gold medallists: Betty Cuthbert (4); Shirley Strickland de la Hunty (3); and Marjorie Jackson (2)
Medallists at more than one Games: Shirley Strickland de la Hunty and Jared Tallent (3 Games); Betty Cuthbert, Pam Kilborn, Raelene Boyle, Cathy Freeman, Sally Pearson (2 Games)
 Relay medals: A total of 5 (including 1 gold medal and 1 silver medal for Women's 4 × 100 m, plus 1 gold medal for Men's 1 x 400 m and 2 silver medals for Men's 4 × 400 m)

Event Medal Summary 1896-2021
Summary of Olympics athletics medals won by Australian male and female athletes. Australian athletes have not won medals in the following events scheduled for the 2020 Summer Olympics: 5000 metres, 3000 m steeplechase  and the hammer throw.

- n/a - not a discipline for the gender

Medallists 1896-2021
List of individual and relay Australian medallists.

See also
Athletics in Australia
Australia at the Olympics

References

External links
Athletics Australia Historical Results - Olympics

Athletics in Australia
Athletics
Australia at the Summer Olympics
Athletics at the Summer Olympics